Karlheinz Lemken is a German television actor.

He is married to the actress Andrea Dahmen, with whom he had a daughter Julia Dahmen who is also an actress.

Filmography

References

Bibliography
 Charles P. Mitchell. The Hitler Filmography: Worldwide Feature Film and Television Miniseries Portrayals, 1940 through 2000. McFarland, 2002.

External links

1946 births
Living people
German male television actors
People from Oberhausen